Sergei Vasilyevich Gorokhov (born 12 November 1981) is a former Russian football player.

Club career
He played 3 seasons in the Russian Football National League for FC Dynamo Stavropol, FC Zhemchuzhina Sochi and FC Metallurg Krasnoyarsk.

International career
He represented Russia at the 1998 UEFA European Under-16 Championship.

Refereeing career
After retiring as a player, he worked as an assistant referee in the Russian Professional Football League from 2005 to 2009.

References

1981 births
Living people
Russian footballers
Russia youth international footballers
Association football forwards
FC Spartak Vladikavkaz players
FC Dynamo Stavropol players
FC Zhemchuzhina Sochi players
FC Yenisey Krasnoyarsk players
Russian football referees